Johannesburg Stadium  is a stadium, in the Doornfontein suburb of Johannesburg, Gauteng Province, South Africa. The stadium has a sweeping roof and can accommodate 37,500 people.

It was originally built as an athletics stadium, but also hosted football and rugby matches.

The eighth IAAF World Cup in Athletics was held at the stadium in 1998. It served as the main stadium for the 1999 All-Africa Games.

It is mostly used as a training ground for the Orlando Pirates and the Golden Lions.

Michael Jackson performed two shows (sold out) on his History World Tour, on 10 and 12 October 1997. Also he planned to give 2 concerts on September 30 and October 2, 1993, but these plans were suspended due to violence in Johannesburg.

Bon Jovi performed at the stadium during their These Days Tour on December 1, 1995.

Gloria Estefan performed at the stadium during her The Evolution Tour on March 22, 1997.

Tina Turner concluded the African leg of her Wildest Dreams Tour, with two consecutive shows, on April 21–22, 1996.

U2 finished their Popmart Tour at the stadium on March 21, 1998.

Kendrick Lamar also performed his South African leg of his international tour here on February 8, 2014.

See also
 Ellis Park Stadium

References

External links

South Africa
Rugby union stadiums in South Africa
Soccer venues in South Africa
Sports venues in Johannesburg
Stadiums of the African Games
Multi-purpose stadiums in South Africa
Sports venues completed in 1992
1992 establishments in South Africa